Anqoun, also called Ankoun, is a relatively large town in the Sidon District which is one of three  districts of the South Governorate in Lebanon. The South Governorate, known also as, Mohafazah of South Lebanon is one of the eight mohafazats (governorates) of Lebanon, containing three major historic and economic cities: Sidon (also known as Saida), Tyre (also known as Soor), and Jezzine.

Anqoun is located 14 km away from the city of Sidon which is the capital of the district and the governorate, and 51 km away from Beirut. Anqoun's  surface stretches for 9.2 km² (920 hectares - 3.5512 mi²), and its elevations above sea level is around 100 meters (328.1 feet - 109.36 yard).

There are six mosques in the town, one public library, one small hospital, as well as two schools: one private and one public. A large portion of Anqoun's population hold university degrees and work as doctors, nurses, lawyers, teachers, engineers. Others work in the public and governmental sectors, primarily, in the police department and the military. Several of its students graduated with the highest degrees holding PhDs in Engineering, medical sciences, military sciences, Nursing, as well as many other sectors.

A large number of Anqounis live currently outside the town because of the several wars that had occurred over the last 60 years in the country. The Israeli airstrikes over the south from the Israeli–Lebanese conflict caused a huge portion of the people to flee to Beirut and to even leave the country. At the moment, a large number of the population that exceeds 50% of the total Anqouni populations, lives in Beirut or outside Lebanon. Almost every house in this town has one of its members living and working abroad, or at least studying abroad. These immigrants are spread all over the seven continents. From United States and Canada to Latin America, Africa, Europe, and Australia, Anqounis are found wherever you travel. In the Arab region, Anqounis live and work primarily in the Persian Gulf region. Whereas Libya, Jordan, and Egypt still have very few immigrants especially after the Arab Spring.

In the Struggle with Israel, Anqoun is proud of several martyrs who sacrificed their lives for the liberation of the Lebanese southern territories which were occupied by Israel for over 20 years. Ibrahim Farhat, Ahmad Zaiour, and Sana'a Mehaidli are only three out of more than 25 Anqouni martyrs, representing the three major political parties present in the town.

References

External links
 Map of road network
 http://moim.gov.lb/
Aanqoun, Localiban

Populated places in Sidon District
Phoenician cities